Samar's 1st congressional district is one of the two congressional districts of the Philippines in the province of Samar. It has been represented in the House of Representatives of the Philippines since 1916 and earlier in the Philippine Assembly from 1907 to 1916. The district consists of the city of Calbayog and adjacent municipalities of Almagro, Gandara, Matuguinao, Pagsanghan, San Jorge, Santa Margarita, Santo Niño, Tagapul-an and Tarangnan. It is currently represented in the 18th Congress by Stephen James T. Tan of the Nacionalista Party (NP)

Representation history

Election results

2022

2019

2016

2013

2010

See also
Legislative districts of Samar

References

Congressional districts of the Philippines
Politics of Samar (province)
1907 establishments in the Philippines
Congressional districts of Eastern Visayas
Constituencies established in 1907